Sixteenth HD1080 (or HD1080/16) is a display resolution that is the same aspect ratio and one 16th the area of 1080 line high-definition TV resolution.

HD1080 is 1920x1080 pixels, so dividing the resolution by 4 in each axis gives 480x270 pixels. This is a computationally convenient process, as HD1080 content can be scaled down simply by summing blocks of 16 pixels and dividing by 16 (arithmetic shift right 4 bits).

HD720 is 1280x720 pixels, i.e. 2/3 the resolution of HD1080 in each axis. HD720
content thus needs to be scaled by a factor of 3/8 in each axis, producing 3x3 pixels for every 8x8 pixels in. This is not as easy as scaling HD1080 content.

In practice, these displays are made with 272 rows of pixels where it is more convenient to manufacture pixels in multiples of 8x8. It also helps image compression and decompression, which is commonly done on 8x8 or 16x16 blocks of pixels.

Applications
Sixteenth HD1080 displays are generally intended for Portable Media Players, where they are well suited to showing scaled-down HD1080 content that is the coming standard in media (e.g. Blu-ray discs).

The PlayStation Portable uses a 480x272 display, suggesting potential use as a Portable Media Player as well as a games machine.

Microsoft's Zune HD uses a 480x272 OLED display to properly scale HD video when it is being displayed on the device.

Digital imaging